Charles F. Cameron (1819 – date of death unknown) was an Irish cricketer active in first-class cricket in 1849. He played in one match only for a Lancashire XI against a Yorkshire XI at the Botanical Gardens in Manchester, Cameron batted in both of Lancashire's innings, but failed to score any runs; he was dismissed bowled as one of Richard Skelton's seven wickets in their first-innings, and ended their second-innings not out.

References

External links
 

1819 births
Date of death unknown
Irish cricketers
Manchester Cricket Club cricketers